Time Out for Peggy was a British television series which aired 1958-1959. A sitcom set in a boarding house, the series starred Billie Whitelaw. It was produced by ABC Weekend TV and aired on ITV. None of the episodes are known to still exist.

References

External links
Time Out for Peggy at IMDb

1958 British television series debuts
1959 British television series endings
1950s British sitcoms
ITV sitcoms
Black-and-white British television shows
English-language television shows
Lost television shows
Television shows produced by ABC Weekend TV